Kelly Tamsma Piquet Souto Maior (born 7 December 1988) is a Brazilian model, columnist, blogger and  public relations professional.

Life and career 
Kelly Piquet was born in Homburg, Germany. She is the daughter of Nelson Piquet, Brazilian racing driver and three-time Formula One World Champion, and Sylvia Tamsma, a Dutch  model. She spent most of her childhood living in the South of France. At the age of 12, she moved to Brazil where she lived until she was 15 years old. After that Piquet returned to France, and lived there for another year before moving to England to study at a boarding school. At the age of 17, she returned to Brazil to attend her senior year of high school. Piquet attended Marymount Manhattan College in New York, majoring in International Relations with an emphasis on political science and economics. During college, she took an internship in fashion and decided to continue working in the area. She worked at Vogue Latinoamerica, Bergdorf Goodman, KCD PR agency, in addition to being a columnist for Marie Claire magazine.

As a model, Piquet posed for PatBO and Lucas Boccalão, in addition she has walked the catwalk in some fashion shows.

In April 2015, Piquet became responsible for Formula E social media coverage.

Personal life
In January 2017, Piquet began dating the Russian Formula One driver Daniil Kvyat. She has a daughter with Kvyat, born in July 2019. In December of the same year the relationship came to an end. She has been publicly dating Dutch two time Formula One World Champion Max Verstappen since January 2021.

References

External links 
 
 

1988 births
Brazilian bloggers
Brazilian columnists
Brazilian expatriates in France
Brazilian female models
Brazilian people of Dutch descent
Living people
Marymount Manhattan College alumni
People from Homburg, Saarland
Kelly Tamsma Piquet
Racing drivers' wives and girlfriends
Brazilian women bloggers
Brazilian women columnists